Ficus rumphii is a banyan fig species in the family Moraceae.  No subspecies are listed in the Catalogue of Life.  The species can be found in: India, southern China, Indo-China and Malesia.  In Vietnam it may be called lâm vồ or đa mít.

Gallery

References

External links 
 
 

rumphii
Trees of Vietnam
Flora of Indo-China
Flora of Malesia